Frank Banham (born April 14, 1975) is a Canadian-born Hungarian former professional ice hockey winger who last played for Hungarian club, SAPA Fehérvár AV19 in the Austrian Hockey League (EBEL).

Playing career
Initially drafted 147th overall by the Washington Capitals in the 1993 NHL Entry Draft, Banham played 27 regular season games in the NHL for the Mighty Ducks of Anaheim scoring 9 goals and 2 assists for 11 points and 5 games for the Phoenix Coyotes, scoring no points and collecting 2 penalty minutes.  He spent much of his time in the respective AHL affiliates, the Cincinnati Mighty Ducks and the Springfield Falcons.  He has also played in Finland, Russia, Switzerland, Austria and Sweden.

After a successful first season with Alba Volan, Banham opted to sign a two-year contract extension to remain with the Hungarian club, on July 9, 2013.

Career statistics

Regular season and playoffs

International

Awards and trophies
 SM-liiga champion (with Jokerit) – 2001–02
 Erste Bank Eishockey Liga champion (with Red Bull Salzburg) (2) – 2006–07, 2007–08
 WHL East First All-Star Team – 1996

References

External links
 

1975 births
Fehérvár AV19 players
Baltimore Bandits players
Canadian ice hockey right wingers
Hungarian ice hockey players
Cincinnati Mighty Ducks players
EC Red Bull Salzburg players
EHC Biel players
Espoo Blues players
HC Dynamo Moscow players
HC Fribourg-Gottéron players
HDD Olimpija Ljubljana players
Ice hockey people from Alberta
Jokerit players
KHL Medveščak Zagreb players
Living people
Malmö Redhawks players
Mighty Ducks of Anaheim players
People from Sturgeon County
Phoenix Coyotes players
SaiPa players
Saskatoon Blades players
Springfield Falcons players
Washington Capitals draft picks
Canadian expatriate ice hockey players in Austria
Canadian expatriate ice hockey players in Slovenia
Canadian expatriate ice hockey players in Croatia
Canadian expatriate ice hockey players in Hungary
Canadian expatriate ice hockey players in Finland
Canadian expatriate ice hockey players in Russia
Canadian expatriate ice hockey players in Switzerland
Canadian expatriate ice hockey players in Sweden